Ho-Hum is a pop/rock band based in Bradley, Arkansas, United States, formed by the brothers Lenny and Rod Bryan.

History
The band was formed when Lenny and Rod Bryan, sports scholarship students, were attending Ouachita Baptist University during the early 1990s. A homemade demo earned the band a label deal with Universal Records, which released its first album, Local, in 1996, produced by Clive Langer and Alan Winstanley. Ho-Hum asked and were granted release from their contractual obligation to Universal when the band claimed the label did not sufficiently promote the album. The band eventually formed its own label, Playadel Records, through which several subsequent albums have been released.

Discography

References

 http://www.arktimes.com/arkansas/ArkansasMusicPollCompletealbumlist/Page

Rock music groups from Arkansas
Musical groups from Little Rock, Arkansas